Fellowship of the Royal Society of Canada (FRSC) is an award granted to individuals that the Royal Society of Canada judges to have "made remarkable contributions in the arts, the humanities and the sciences, as well as in Canadian public life". , there are more than 2,000 living Canadian fellows, including scholars, artists, and scientists such as Margaret Atwood, Philip J. Currie, David Suzuki, Stephen Waddams, and Demetri Terzopoulos. There are four types of fellowship:
 Honorary fellows (a title of honour)
 Regularly elected fellows
 Specially elected fellows 
 Foreign fellows (neither residents nor citizens of Canada)

References

Academic awards
Royal Society of Canada
Fellows of learned societies of Canada
1882 establishments in Canada